The 2007 Indiana Hoosiers football team represented Indiana University Bloomington during the 2007 NCAA Division I FBS football season. The Hoosiers were coached by Bill Lynch, who was in his first season as head coach following the death of Terry Hoeppner. The Hoosiers played their home games at Memorial Stadium in Bloomington, Indiana. With a win over Purdue  in the last game of the regular season, the Hoosiers became bowl eligible for the first time since 1993.

Schedule

2008 NFL Draftees

References

Indiana
Indiana Hoosiers football seasons
Indiana Hoosiers football